Damien Markman (born 7 January 1978) is an English former professional footballer who played in The Football League for Wycombe Wanderers.

References

English footballers
Slough Town F.C. players
Wycombe Wanderers F.C. players
Rovaniemen Palloseura players
Harrow Borough F.C. players
Yeading F.C. players
Bracknell Town F.C. players
Egham Town F.C. players
Boreham Wood F.C. players
Beaconsfield Town F.C. players
Braintree Town F.C. players
Sutton Coldfield Town F.C. players
Redditch United F.C. players
Bromsgrove Rovers F.C. players
English Football League players
1978 births
Living people
Association football forwards